Sport Club Damash Gilan (Bashgah-e Vârzeshi-ye Damash Gilân), commonly known as Damash Gilan, also spelled Damash Guilan, is an Iranian football club based in Rasht, Gilan, that competes in the Azadegan League. The club was founded in 1960 as Taj Rasht Football Club.

The football team plays its home games at the Shahid Dr. Azodi Stadium which has a seating capacity of 11,000. The club is also using the Sardar Jangal Stadium which has a seating capacity of 15,000. The club is owned and supported by Esmaeil Hajipour.

Damash is the oldest existing football club in Rasht and has a large history in Gilan football. It is one of the most supported clubs in Gilan football, having won one Azadegan League trophy, one Rasht League title, and two final participations in the Hazfi Cup. Damash holds a long-standing enmity with provincial rivals Malavan known as the El Gilano, and with local rivals Sepidrood.

History

Establishment
The club was founded as Taj Rasht Football Club in 1960. The club was one of Taj Tehran branches at the time. From the beginning, Taj Rasht was able to attract some of the best players of Gilan.

Before 1970
Before the 1970s, Iran did not have an official national football league. Most clubs participated in championships of their city or province. In addition to that Taj Rasht played in the Gilan Province League until 1970.

1970s
In 1970, the Local League was created. The league included teams from all Iran in different qualifying tournaments. Taj Rasht finished fourth in Group A of their qualifying tournament. The club also participated in the 1971–72 Local League season. Taj Rasht missed again qualification for the final stage after they achieved the last place in their group again.

In 1972, the Takht Jamshid Cup was founded as the national league and included teams from all over the country. However, Taj Rasht could not qualify and therefore played again in the Gilan Province League.

Abouzar Rasht
In 1975 the club changed its name for the first time. Until 1983 the club was called Abouzar Rasht Football Club. Due to the Iranian Revolution and the Iran–Iraq War, the Takht Jamshid Cup was dissolved and also the lower leagues were unorganized. As a result, the club took part in regional championships and cups only irregularly.

Esteghlal Rasht

In 1983 Abouzar changed its name into Esteghlal Rasht Football Club. Esteghlal means independence in Persian. In 1991 the Azadegan League was formed as the top flight of Iranian football. Esteghlal Rasht took part in the league in the 1991–92 season, but was relegated at the end of the season.

Due to sponsorship, the club was known as Esteghlal Gaz Rasht Football Club in 1992–93 Iran Football's 2nd Division. After playing many years in Iran Football's 2nd Division, they were promoted to Azadegan League in 2000. They finished 10th in 2000–01 season.

In the summer of 2001, the Iran Pro League was established as the professional football league of Iran, Azadegan League was declared as the second-highest professional league in the Iranian football league system. All clubs from the 2000–01 Azadegan League season took participate in the 2001–02 Iran Pro League. Esteghlal Rasht was relegated after an embarrassingly lost 9–2 to Aboomoslem on the last matchday of the season. They finished 13th in that season.

Pegah Gilan
Due to financial problems and relegation, the Pegah Dairy Company took over the club in the summer of 2002. The club was renamed as Pegah Gilan Football Club. In 2007, however, a club called Esteghlal Shahrdari Rasht was founded again, which could participate as a separate club in the Gilan Provincial League.

Pegah managed to get promoted to the first division and finished 9th in the 2003–04 season. A year later, relegation took place again. Then the club played two years in the Azadegan League. In 2007 they were able to return to the Iran Pro League, known as the Persian Gulf Cup since 2006. With 15th place in the 2007–08 season, Pegah was able to prevent relegation. Pegah also qualified for the Final of the Hazfi Cup this season. After Pegah won the first leg 1–0, they lost in the second leg against Esteghlal in front of almost 100,000 spectators at the Azadi Stadium with 0–3.

Damash Gilan
In the summer of 2008, Pegah Gilan was struggling with financial problems. In October of the same year, the Aria Investment Development Company, then owned by Mahafarid Amir Khosravi, took over the club. The club was renamed Sport Club Damash Gilan. Damash is a small historical village in Jirandeh near Rasht. The club later adopted the Lilium ledebourii, a typical plant from this region, in its logo. The renaming ensures a positive reaction from the fans.

Pro and Azadegan League

The club shuttled between the first two leagues for the following years. In the 2008–09 season, they finished 17th and had to relegate to the Azadegan League. In the 2009–10 season, Damash failed to Sanat Naft Abadan in the play-offs and missed promotion. A year later, the club won the title for it and managed to rise. Between 2011 and 2013, the club played two decent years in the Persian Gulf Cup and came in 7th in 2011–12 and 11th in 2012–13. During this time, Alireza Jahanbakhsh also made a name for himself with good performances, 10 goals in 44 matches. In the summer of 2013, he moved to the Dutch Eredivisie to NEC Nijmegen. Iranian football legend Mehdi Mahdavikia also played for Damash between 2011 and 2012.

Starting in 2013, the club experienced difficult years and relegated at the end of the 2013–14 season. Then followed two disappointing years in the Azadegan League. In the 2014–15 Azadegan League season, the club only finished 6th and missed promotion. In the 2015–16 season, Damash even had to relegate to the League 2.

Since 2016
Due to very great financial difficulties, the club was close to being dissolved in March 2016. The Gilan Football Organization, therefore, took over the rights to the club and so Damash could end the season. After relegation, the club should be renamed Shahr-e Baran Football Club, which led to major protests from fans. Damash then kept his name.

In 2019 Damash sensationally reached the Hazfi Cup Final against Persepolis in the Foolad Arena in Ahvaz. The game turned into a scandal as the stadium was filled with over 30,000 Perespolis supporters hours before kick-off. As a result, the approximately 1,000 Damash fans could not enter the stadium and the kick-off was delayed by a few hours. In the end, Damash lost to Persepolis 0–1.

After three years in the League 2, Damash returned to the Azadegan League. The club replaced Karoon Arvand Khorramshahr for the 2019–20 season.

Name history
Taj Rasht Football Club (1960–1975)
Abouzar Rasht Football Club (1975–1983)
Esteghlal Rasht Football Club (1983–1992)
Esteghlal Gaz Rasht Football Club (1992–1993)
Esteghlal Rasht Football Club (1993–2002)
Pegah Gilan Football Club (2002–2008)
Sport Club Damash Gilan (2008–present)

Crest
The name Damash goes back to a historical village in Jirandeh near Rasht. In 2016, Damash adopted the Lilium ledebourii, a typical plant from this region, in its logo.

Stadium

Traditionally, Damash Gilan plays its home games at the Shahid Dr. Azodi Stadium which has a seating capacity of 11,000. The stadium was opened in 1990 and is owned by the club. The stadium was renovated from 2009 to 2011. It is also the traditional home venue of the local rival Sepidrood.

Furthermore, Damash plays some of its home games at the Sardar Jangal Stadium which has a seating capacity of 15,000. The stadium was opened in 2007 and is owned by Sepidrood.

Rivalries

El Gilano

Matches between Malavan of Bandar-e Anzali and the two teams from Rasht, Damash Gilan, and Sepidrood Rasht are known as El Gilano. There is a very deep rivalry and derbies are characterized by great intensity. The stadiums at these games are usually sold out or even overcrowded. There are also regular riots between the various fan groups. Since Damash has changed its name a few times in contrast to Sepidrood, the rivalry between Malavan and Sepidrood is a bit stronger and more traditional. Basically, however, football games between clubs in Northern Iran are always characterized by a lot of passion and are very important to the local population.

Further rivalries
Within Rasht, Damash has a minor rivalry with PAS Gilan. PAS Gilan was founded in 1961 and, like Damash and Sepidrood, is a traditional club in Rasht. However, PAS Gilan has never made it to the Persian Gulf Pro League or Azadegan League.

Damash then has a bigger rivalry with Nassaji Mazandaran from Qaem Shahr. Nassaji has the same club colors as Damash, blue and red, and has a very large fan base in the northern provinces of Iran.

Seasons

The table below chronicles the achievements of Damash Gilan in various competitions since 1970.

Notes:The Persian Gulf Pro League was formerly known as Iran Pro League (IPL) and Persian Gulf Cup (PGC)  The Azadegan League was the highest division between 1991 and 2001  The League 2 was formerly known as Iran 2nd Division  The League 3 was formerly known as Iran 3rd Division

Honours

Domestic
Azadegan League
Champions (1): 2010–11
Hazfi Cup
Runners-up (2): 2007–08, 2018–19
Rasht League
Champions (1): 1973

First-team squad

For recent transfers, see List of Iranian football transfers winter 2018–19''.

Club managers

Records

Top goalscorers

Top appearances

Last updated: May 16, 2016.
Bolded players are currently on the Damash squad.

See also
 Damash Tehran
 Gahar Zagros

References

External links

  Official old Website
  Damash Guilan Fan Site
  Damash Guilan Official Website
  Damash Guilan Fan Site
  Players and Results

Football clubs in Iran
Association football clubs established in 2008
Sport in Gilan Province
2008 establishments in Iran
Damash Gilan